Under the federal law of the United States, the term "special Government employee" (SGE) refers to an advisor, expert or consultant who is appointed to work with federal government. The role of special Government employees is defined in 18 U.S.C. § 202.

The SGE category was created by Congress in 1962 and was aimed at allowing the federal government to take advantage of outside experts who are employed in the private sector. The Office of Government Ethics has stated that "SGEs were originally conceived as a 'hybrid' class, in recognition of the fact that the simple categories of 'employee' and 'non-employee' are no longer adequate to describe the multiplicity of ways in which modern government gets its work done." SGEs may be either paid or unpaid. SGEs may only be "retained, designated, appointed, or employed" by the government for "not more than 130 days" during any consecutive 365-day period.

Many SGEs have limited roles on federal advisory committees. A 2016 Government Accountability Office found that over the decade from 2005 to 2014, the federal government had an average of roughly 2,000 SGEs in any given year, with a low of about 500 (in 2013) and a high of about 3,100 (in 2009). SGEs have a variety of roles, depending on the agency; for example, Department of Justice SGEs included attorneys with the September 11th Victim Compensation Fund, Department of Health and Human Services SGEs included medical professionals associated with the National Disaster Medical System, and National Science Foundation and Nuclear Regulatory Commission SGEs include scientists and technical experts. 

SGEs are subject to some federal ethics rules, but are exempt from others. SGEs are exempt from Federal Acquisition Regulation 3.601, which states that a Contracting Officer may not knowingly award a contract to a Government employee or to an organization owned or substantially owned by one or more Government employees.  If a contract were to arise directly out of the special Government employee's advisory services, or the appointment could be influenced by the special Government employee, or another conflict of interest were to affect the appointment, then the prohibition would still apply.

Notable examples
Notable examples of SGEs include Huma Abedin (who was an SGE in the State Department in 2012, working for Secretary of State Hillary Rodham Clinton) and Scott Atlas (an advisor appointed by President Donald Trump to the White House Coronavirus Task Force in 2020).

Notes

See also
 Excepted service
 Government employees in the United States
 United States federal civil service

References

United States federal legislation